South Bay is a suburban Canadian community in the city of Saint John in Saint John County, New Brunswick.

The community is west of the former city of Lancaster and was amalgamated into Saint John with that city in 1967.

South Bay derives its name from a small baythat is formed by Green Head, an island in the Saint John River that separates South Bay from the Reversing Falls gorge.

References

Neighbourhoods in Saint John, New Brunswick